Vasas Sport Club is a professional football club based in Budapest, Hungary.

Team
Most points in a season: 64 (1996–97 and 1997–98) (3-point system)
Most goals in a season: 100 (1976–77)

Player

Most capped players

 András Komjáti (443)
 Pál Berendy (382)
 Kálmán Ihász (364)

Players with most international appearances
 Kálmán Mészöly (61)
 László Sárosi (45)
 Béla Várady (36)

Top Goalscorer 

  Gyula Szilágyi (295)

References

External links

Vasas SC